Boris Grigoryants (Russian: Борис Григорьянц) was a Turkmen football manager.

National team
Under him, Turkmenistan managed to accomplish qualification for the 2010 AFC Challenge Cup, winning all three consecutive games.

Was replaced by young coach Yazguly Hojageldiyev in 2010.

FK Asgabat

During his 1-year tenure with FK Aşgabat, he routed Sri Lanka Army SC 5-1, topping their AFC President's Cup group before being subdued 2-1 by FC Dordoi Bishkek in the semi-final.

He died November 2, 2016.

References

Turkmenistan national football team managers
Turkmenistan football managers
Turkmenistan people of Armenian descent
Ethnic Armenian sportspeople
Soviet Armenians
Sportspeople from Ashgabat
1953 births
2016 deaths